Reinhold William Eugen Petersson (later Björneman, 6 October 1895 – 10 May 1965) was a Swedish athlete. He competed at the 1920 Summer Olympics in the long jump and 4 × 100 m relay and won a gold and a bronze medal, respectively. Petersson won four Swedish long jump titles, in 1918–20 and 1924.

In 1918 Petersson graduated from the Schartaus institute of trade and then worked in the banking sector in Germany, France and Britain. In 1928 he became assistant director and then Vice President of J. G. Schwartz in Norrköping. In 1938 he changed to a position of assistant director and then vice president at margarine factories in Stockholm, and since 1941 he headed slaughterhouses in Malmö. In 1940 he represented Sweden at a special trade mission in London.

References 

1895 births
1965 deaths
People from Mörbylånga Municipality
Swedish male long jumpers
Swedish male sprinters
Olympic athletes of Sweden
Athletes (track and field) at the 1920 Summer Olympics
Olympic gold medalists for Sweden
Olympic bronze medalists for Sweden
Medalists at the 1920 Summer Olympics
Olympic gold medalists in athletics (track and field)
Olympic bronze medalists in athletics (track and field)
Sportspeople from Kalmar County